Southern Nevada Off Road Enthusiasts (SNORE) is a  club-style Desert racing organization.

Established in 1969 as a club of enthusiasts, it has grown into a major desert motorsports racing event organizer in the Southwest United States and is based out of Las Vegas Nevada.

In 2010 SNORE, announced the revival of the famous Mint 400 off-road race which was subsequently sold to Mad Media and managed by Best in the Desert under a 2-year contract.

References

Auto racing organizations in the United States
Rally raids
Off-road racing series